Bryan M. Clayton is an American mobile app developer who is the cofounder of GreenPal, a mobile app and online freelancing platform that connects homeowners with local lawn care providers.  He is also the ex-owner of Peach Tree, a landscaping company that he sold in 2013.

Early life
Clayton started working as a lawn cutter at the age of 12. He attended Middle Tennessee State University, where he received a B.A. in Business Administration.

Career
In 1998, at the age of 18, he co-founded the Tennessee-based landscaping company Peach Tree, Inc., with Chip Burnette. Clayton and Burnette went on to work on landscaping accounts for Jack in the Box, Cracker Barrel, Fifth Third Bank, among others. In 2013, Clayton sold Peach Tree, Inc. to LUSA Holdings, operator of Landscapes USA. The company had over 125 people working for them and had revenue of over $7 million annually at the time it was sold.

In 2012, Clayton devised the idea for a mobile app called GreenPal after reading an article about Airbnb. Clayton recruited his childhood friends, Zach Hendrix, Gene Caballero, and Ross Brooks as co-founders for his idea. Together, they founded GreenPal.As of 2017, Clayton is the company’s largest shareholder, with 45 percent of the company’s shares.

Clayton is also a mentor at Accelerators Organization. Clayton has been a guest on dozens of podcasts, including on Growth by Sabir, ByteAnt, John Meese, Duct Tape Marketing, and Predictable Profits.

Personal life
Clayton enjoys participating in sports such as hiking, martial arts, and long-distance running. He also volunteers for the charity Achilles International in his spare time.

References

Living people
American company founders
21st-century American businesspeople
Year of birth missing (living people)